The European Girls' Team Championship is a European amateur team golf championship for women up to 18 organised by the European Golf Association. The inaugural event was held in 1991. It was played in odd-numbered years from 1991 to 1999 and has been played annually since 1999.

Since the European Lady Junior's Team Championship for women under 22, was discontinued in 2006, due to the trend of players reaching elite level at an earlier age, the European Girls' Team Championship has been regarded as the most important junior team event in Europe outside the British Isles.

Many female European players on the world's leading professional golf tours have played in the event during their early careers. This include (as of October 2022) every European winner of LPGA Tour tournaments from 2014 (Suzann Pettersen, Anna Nordqvist, Caroline Masson, Carlota Ciganda, Charley Hull, Pernilla Lindberg, Georgia Hall, Céline Boutier, Madelene Sagström, Sophia Popov, Mel Reid, Matilda Castren, Leona Maguire, Nanna Koerstz Madsen, Maja Stark and Jodi Ewart Shadoff and also American Jessica Korda representing the Czech Republic).

The championship is a counting event for Junior Solheim Cup qualification.

Format
The championship can be contested by women aged 18 years old or younger.

The format consists of 20 teams, each of 6 players, competing in two rounds of stroke play, out of which the five lowest scores from each team's six players will count each day. The total addition of the five lowest scores will constitute the team's score and determine which team is qualified for the last three rounds of match play. 

Only teams in contention for a medal will play a match format of two foursomes and five singles, while the other teams will play a one foursome and four singles match format.

Up to and including 2010, each team consisted of four players. The 2020 event took place in a reduced format, with four players in each team, due to the COVID-19 pandemic.

Results

Winning nations' summary

Source:

Winning teams
2022: France: Ines Archer, Maylis Lamoure, Constance Fouillet, Vairana Heck, Nastasia Nadaud, Carla de Troia
2021: Spain: Paula Balanzategui, Cayetana Fernández, Julia López, Lucia López, Paula Martin, Andrea Revuelta 
2020: Germany: Charlotte Back, Chiara Horder, Paula Schulz-Hanssen, Sophie Witt  
2019: Denmark: Natacha Husted, Alberte Thuesen, Amalie Leth-Nissen, Cecilie Leth-Nissen, Anne Norman, Olivia Grønborg  
2018: Italy: Alessia Nobilio, Virginia Bossi, Emilie Alba Paltrinieri, Benedetta Moresco, Anna Zanusso, Caterina Don  
2017: Sweden: Frida Kinhult, Beatrice Wallin, Maja Stark, Julia Engström, Amanda Linnér, Linn Grant
2016: Italy: Caterina Don, Angelica Moresco, Alessandra Fanali, Clara Manzalini, Alessia Nobilio, Emilie Alba Paltrinieri
2015: Spain: Ana Peláez, María Herraez Galvez, Marta Perez Sanmartin, María Parra, Paz Marfa Sans, Elena Hualde Zuniga   
2014: France: Mathilda Cappeliez, Elisabeth Codet, Eva Gilly, Agathe Laisné, Lauralie Migneaux, Marion Veysseyre   
2013: Sweden: Linn Andersson, Martina Edberg, Mia Landegren, Linnea Ström, Emma Svensson, Jessica Vasilic    
2012: Sweden: Linn Andersson, Isabella Deilert, Mia Landegren, Linnea Ström, Emma Nilsson, Elsa Westin    
2011: France: Emilie Alonso, Shannon Aubert, Céline Boutier, Laure Castelain, Perrine  Delacour, Manon Gidali     
2010: France: Alexandra Bonetti, Céline Boutier, Léa Charpier, Manon Gidali
2009: Ireland: Leona Maguire, Lisa Maguire, Laura McCarthy, Stephanie Medow
2008: Sweden: Josephine Janson, Johanna Tillström, Louise Larsson, Amanda Sträng
2007: Sweden: Caroline Hedwall, Nathalie Månsson, Jacqueline Hedwall, Anna Dahlberg-Söderström          
2006: Germany: Pia Hallbig, Caroline Masson,  Nicola Rössler, Valerie Sternebeck           
2005: England: Jodi Ewart, Kiran Matharu, Mel Reid, Emma Sheffield           
2004: Sweden: Pernilla Lindberg, Caroline Westrup, Linn Gustafsson, Mikaela Bäcktstedt
2003: Spain: Azahara Muñoz, Belén Mozo, Emma Cabrera-Bello, Ana Sanzó-Rubert 
2002: Spain: María Hernández, Azahara Muñoz, María Recasens, Adriana Zwanck
2001: Spain: Immaculada de la Lama, Lucia Mar, Elisa Serramia, Azahara Muñoz, 
2000: Sweden: Eva Bjärvall, Josefin Gustavsson, Golda Johansson, Karin Sjödin
1999: Germany: Silke Braunschweig, Bettina Hauert, Jessica Issler, Denise Simon
1997: Spain: María Beautell, Nuria Clau,  María Gaccia-Estrada, Paula Marti
1995: Sweden: Anna Becker, Marie Hedberg, Jessica Krantz, Eva-Lotta Strömlid 
1993: Spain: Alexandra Armas, Sara Beautell, Iciar Elguezabal, Ana Belén Sánchez
1991: Spain: Laura Navarro, Mabel Pascual del Pobil, María José Pons, Vanessa Vignali

See also 
European Lady Junior's Team Championship – discontinued amateur team golf championship for women under 22 played 1968–2006 organized by the European Golf Association
European Ladies' Team Championship – amateur team golf championship for women organized by the European Golf Association.
European Ladies Amateur Championship – individual golf championship organized by the European Golf Association.
European Boys' Team Championship – amateur team golf championship for men up to 18 organized by the European Golf Association

References

External links
European Golf Association: Full results

Amateur golf tournaments
Team golf tournaments
Women's golf tournaments
Recurring sporting events established in 1991